The Men competition at the 2017 World Championships was held on 4 and 5 March 2017.

Results

500 m
The race was started on 4 March 2017 at 13:42.

5000 m
The race was started on 4 March 2017 at 15:55.

1500 m
The race was started on 5 March 2017 at 14:28.

10,000 m
The race was started on 5 March 2017 at 16:22.

Overall standings
After all events.

References

Men